{{DISPLAYTITLE:C7H5FO2}}
The molecular formula C7H5FO2 (molar mass: 140.11 g/mol) may refer to:

 Fluorobenzoic acids
 2-Fluorobenzoic acid
 3-Fluorobenzoic acid
 4-Fluorobenzoic acid